The Grey District Library, also known as the Greymouth Public Library, is a public library located in Greymouth in the West Coast region of the South Island of New Zealand.

History 
The Greymouth Library began as the Greymouth Literary Association in 1868. With an annual fee of £2 5s and membership by ballot, the club was not accessible to most citizens. Three years later the association was changed to the Greymouth Literary Society, with a public membership and a public library.

By 1887 the society had a public library and reading-rooms in the Masonic Hall on Mackay Street. However, in September 1887 fire destroyed the Hall. The reading-rooms, books and furniture had been insured for £200.

In the early 1900s the council had approved the building of a new town hall and council offices, however the cost was prohibitive. After applying to Andrew Carnegie for funds to add a library wing to the building, a grant of £2250 was received in 1906. The building, designed by architect Edward Iveagh Lord, was the largest brick building on the West Coast, and had a  clock tower.

By 1936 the library included a children's library on the ground floor.

The entire town hall and library were destroyed by arson on 19 July 1947. Most of the books and some of the furniture were able to be saved.

Collection 
The current library building on Albert Street contains the collection of books, magazines, DVDs and so on that would be expected of a district library. The library provides classes on digital literacy, and an active children's programme.

References 

Libraries in New Zealand
Buildings and structures in the West Coast, New Zealand
Buildings and structures destroyed by arson
Carnegie libraries in New Zealand